Drozdovka is the name of several rural localities in Russia.

Modern localities
Drozdovka, Udmurt Republic, a village in Staroutchansky Selsoviet of Alnashsky District in the Udmurt Republic
Drozdovka, Vladimir Oblast, a village in Kovrovsky District of Vladimir Oblast

Abolished localities
Drozdovka, Murmansk Oblast, an inhabited locality under the administrative jurisdiction of the closed administrative-territorial formation of Ostrovnoy in Murmansk Oblast; abolished in July 2013;